Valpy is a surname. Notable people with the surname include:

Abraham John Valpy (1787–1854), English printer and publisher
Arabella Valpy (1833–1910), New Zealand Salvation Army leader
Juliet Valpy (1835–1911), New Zealand artist
Michael Valpy (born 1942), award-winning Canadian journalist and author
Richard Valpy (1754–1836), schoolmaster in Great Britain
William Henry Valpy (1793–1852), pioneering New Zealand settler
William Henry Valpy, Jr. (1832–1911), pioneering New Zealand settler
Valpy French (1825–1891), Anglican missionary in India and Persia
Catherine Fulton, née Valpy (1829–1919), New Zealand suffragist
Ellen Jeffreys, née Valpy (1827–1904), New Zealand artist

See also
:Category:Valpy-Fulton-Jeffreys family